Sir Charles Kenneth Murchison (22 September 1872 – 17 December 1952) was a British Conservative Party politician.

He was elected at the 1918 general election as Member of Parliament (MP) for Kingston upon Hull East. Standing as a Coalition Conservative, he won the seat with a large majority over the sitting Liberal MP Thomas Ferens.

Murchison did not defend his Hull seat at the 1922 general election, and stood instead in Huntingdonshire. He won the seat, but held it for only a year; at the 1923 general election he was defeated by the Liberal Leonard Costello. Murchison regained the seat from Costello at the general election in October 1924, and was knighted on 18 February 1927. After a further defeat at the 1929 general election, he did not stand  for election to the House of Commons again.

References

External links 

1872 births
1952 deaths
Conservative Party (UK) MPs for English constituencies
UK MPs 1918–1922
UK MPs 1922–1923
UK MPs 1924–1929
Knights Bachelor
Members of London County Council
Politicians awarded knighthoods